Simona Halep was the defending champion, but she chose not to participate this year.
Eugenie Bouchard won her first career title, defeating Karolína Plíšková in the final, 6–2, 4–6, 6–3.

Seeds

Draw

Finals

Top half

Bottom half

Qualifying

Seeds

Qualifiers

Lucky losers

Qualifying draw

First qualifier

Second qualifier

Third qualifier

Fourth qualifier

References 
 Main draw
 Qualifying draw

Nurnberger Versicherungscupandnbsp;- Singles
2014 Singles
2014 in German tennis